The North Wales Coast East Football League is a football league in Wales, at tiers 4 and 5 of the Welsh football league system in North Wales, founded in 2020. The league is under the control of the North Wales Coast Football Association.  The league replaced the former Vale of Clwyd and Conwy Football League, and covers the North East of Wales. A corresponding North Wales Coast West Football League was also established at the same time.

League History
Plans for the new league were discussed in March 2020. There were to be two tiers - the Premier Division – with no more than 16 clubs, at tier 4, with Division One – with no more than 16 clubs, at tier 5.

Member clubs for 2022–23 season

Premier Division

Blaenau Ffestiniog Amateurs
Bro Cernyw
Cerrigydrudion  
Glan Conwy 
Kinmel Bay
Llandudno Junction 
Llandyrnog United 
Llanfairfechan Town
Llannefydd
Llansannan
Meliden
Mochdre Sports 
Penmaenmawr Phoenix
Prestatyn Sports
Rhuddlan Town
St Asaph City

Division One

Abergele
Betws-y-Coed (resigned Dec 2022)
Bow
Caer Clwyd 
Henllan 
Llandudno Amateurs 
Llysfaen 
NFA   
Penrhyn Bay Dragons 
Rhos United 
Rhyl All Stars  
Rhyl Dragons 
Y Glannau

Premier Division Champions

2020s

2020-21: Season void
2021-22: Y Rhyl 1879

Division One Champions

2020s

2020-21: Season void
2021-22: Abergele

Cup Competitions

2020s

2020-21: Season void
2021-22: 
Premier Division
Division One:

References

External links 
North Wales Coast Football Association

Wales
Wales
2020 establishments in Wales
Sports leagues established in 2020
Sport in Anglesey
Sport in Gwynedd